This is a list of members of the Australian House of Representatives from 1975 to 1977. The 13 December 1975 election was a double dissolution of both Houses, with all 127 seats in the House of Representatives, and all 64 seats in the Senate were up for election.  Malcolm Fraser had been commissioned as prime minister following the dismissal of the Prime Minister Gough Whitlam's three-year-old Labor government by Governor-General Sir John Kerr, on 11 November 1975. The same day, Fraser advised the calling of the election, in accordance with Kerr's stipulated conditions.  Thus the Liberal Party of Australia, led by Fraser, with coalition partner the National Country Party, led by Doug Anthony, went to the election as a minority caretaker government. The election resulted in the Coalition securing government with a 30-seat swing in the House of Representatives away from Labor.

1 Labor member Rex Connor died on 22 August 1977; Labor candidate Stewart West won the resulting by-election on 15 October 1977.

References

Members of Australian parliaments by term
20th-century Australian politicians